Tom Boast (13 November 1905 – 19 October 1988) was an Australian swimmer. He competed in the men's 100 metre backstroke event at the 1928 Summer Olympics.

References

External links
 

1905 births
1988 deaths
Australian male backstroke swimmers
Olympic swimmers of Australia
Swimmers at the 1928 Summer Olympics
Swimmers from Brisbane
20th-century Australian people